The Lodha Muslim are a tribal or Adivasi community found in the state of West Bengal in India. They are a Muslim tribe.

Origin

The exact circumstances of the conversion of the Lodha Muslims to Islam remains shrouded in mystery, but the conversion process was gradual, and the community still preserve many of their pre-Islamic customs. They are found mainly in the Midnapore District, in particular in the villages of Madhya Hingli, Uttar Rani Chak, Gamatub, Maniktala, Laldighi, Chapbasan, Sodhpur and Piyada. .

Present circumstances

The traditional occupation of the Lodha was hunting and gathering, in particular catching of snakes and toads, and then selling their skins. They are no longer hunters and gatherers, and community has now taken up the occupation as locksmiths. A small number are also marginal farmers, but their holdings are incredibly small. The bulk of the community are now wage labourers, with a steady immigration to the city of Kolkata.

The Lodha are strictly endogamous community, and prefer to marry close kin. They are residentially segregated, live in their own quarters within the villages they reside. Each settlement contains a jati panchayat or caste council, which maintains social control, and resolves any intra community dispute. The community are Sunni Muslims and  have customs similar to other Bengali Muslims.

See also

 Lodha people
 Kela

References

Social groups of West Bengal
Muslim communities of India
Ethnic groups in India
Indigenous peoples of South Asia
Tribes of West Bengal
Scheduled Tribes of India